South Carolina Highway 391 (SC 391) is a  state highway in the U.S. state of South Carolina. The highway connects rural areas of Aiken County with Prosperity, via Batesburg-Leesville.

Route description
SC 391 begins at an intersection with SC 39 (Old Ninety-Six Indian Trail) northwest of New Holland, Aiken County, where the roadway continues as Wire Road. It travels to the north-northeast. It passes Neeses Pond and crosses Chinquapin Creek, where it enters Lexington County, before it curves to the northwest. The highway crosses over Mare Branch. After it curves to the north, it crosses over Horsepen Creek and passes by Indian Trail Golf Course. Just before entering the city limits of Batesburg-Leesville, the highway passes by Davis Pond and crosses over Duncan Creek. In the city, it intersects U.S. Route 178 (US 178; South Pine Street). The two highways travel concurrently to the northwest. At West Columbia Avenue, they intersect US 1. At West Church Street, they meet SC 23. Here, US 178 splits off, while SC 391 continues to the northwest and immediately begins to curve to the north-northeast. Just before intersecting Marion Street, it begins to curve to the east-northeast. Before leaving the city limits, the highway passes Ridge Crest Memorial Park, curves to the north-northwest, and passes the Batesburg-Leesville Branch Library, Batesburg-Leesville High School, and Batesburg-Leesville Primary School. The highway curves to the north-northeast and crosses over Gin Branch before intersecting the northern terminus of SC 245 (North Lee Street). It crosses over Lick Creek and then enters Saluda County. Just before entering Delmar, SC 391 begins curving to the northwest. Then, it intersects US 378 (Columbia Highway) at a roundabout known as the Saluda Traffic Circle. A short distance later, the highway starts heading to the north and crosses over the Little Saluda River. It intersects the northern terminus of SC 194 (Denny Highway) just before crossing over the Saluda River on the Noah L. Black Bridge into Newberry County. SC 391 begins traveling to the northeast and north before entering Prosperity. As soon as it enters the town, it passes by Prosperity Cemetery. It curves to the north-northwest. Just before McNeary Street, it crosses over railroad tracks and curves to the northwest. At Main Street, it turns left and travels to the northwest. Just before it meets its northern terminus, an intersection with US 76 (C.R. Koon Highway), it crosses over some railroad tracks and passes by the W.L. Mills MD Fitness Park.

Major intersections

See also

References

External links

SC 391 South Carolina Highway Annex

391
Transportation in Aiken County, South Carolina
Transportation in Lexington County, South Carolina
Transportation in Saluda County, South Carolina
Transportation in Newberry County, South Carolina